The Ostzonenmeisterschaft 1948 (English: Championship of the Eastern Zone) was the first football championship in what was to become East Germany. It was played in a one-leg knock-out format with ten participating teams. Each of the five Länder—Mecklenburg-Vorpommern, Brandenburg, Saxony, Thuringia and Saxony-Anhalt—sent two representatives. The regional championships of Saxony, Thuringia and Saxony-Anhalt were ended after the semi finals as by then two participants had been determined. The Ostzone champion was supposed to take part in the 1948 German championship, playing 1. FC Nürnberg in Stuttgart, but the team of SG Planitz was not allowed to travel for political reasons.

Teams qualified for the play-offs

Play-offs

Qualifying round

Quarter finals

Semi finals

Final

Sources 
East Germany 1947/48 at rsssf.com

References

German football championship
1947–48 in German football